Antony David Saint (born 1968, west Northumberland, England) is an English novelist, playwright and screenwriter.

Early life
He had contact with the theatre through the People's Theatre in Heaton. Whilst at university he was guitarist in a rock band The Little Caesars.
In 1993, he joined the UK Immigration Service where he worked for ten years. He later wrote a book, Refusal Shoes, based on this experience.

Career
His credits include 2009's Micro Men (about the men and development stories behind the BBC and Sinclair home computers), the 2008 The Long Walk to Finchley (on the early career of Margaret Thatcher), and one episode of The Whistleblowers in 2007 for ITV. He also wrote the 2006 TV play Service. In 2012 he wrote The Interceptor, which was broadcast on BBC One.

He wrote on the Das Boot television series, which acts as a sequel to the original film.

Personal life
He was married in April 1998 in Northumberland.

Publications
 Refusal Shoes , July 2003 (all published by Serpent's Tail)
 Blag , 2004
 The ASBO Show , 2007

References

External links
 

Living people
Writers from Northumberland
1968 births
British television writers
British male novelists
English television writers
English screenwriters
English male screenwriters
English dramatists and playwrights
English male dramatists and playwrights
British male television writers